is a large trans-Neptunian object in the scattered disc, around  in diameter. It was discovered on 12 June 2021, by American astronomers Scott Sheppard and Chad Trujillo using Cerro Tololo Inter-American Observatory's Dark Energy Camera in Chile, and announced on 31 May 2022. It was 73.9 astronomical units from the Sun when it was discovered, making it one of the most distant known Solar System objects from the Sun . It has been identified in precovery images from as far back as 28 April 2014.

References

External links 
 
 

Minor planet object articles (unnumbered)

20210612